"Don't Let Me Down" is a song by English singer Will Young. It was written by Young, Richard Stannard, Julian Gallagher, Dave Morgan, and Simon Hale and released as his fourth single on 18 November 2002 along with the track "You and I." The song reached number two on the UK Singles Chart. The double A-side single was released in aid of Children in Need.

Track listings

Credits and personnel
Credits are lifted from the UK CD1 liner notes.

Studios
 Recorded and mixed at Biffco Studios (Dublin, Ireland)
 Mastered at Transfermation (London, England)

Personnel

 Richard "Biff" Stannard – writing (as Richard Stannard), backing vocals, drums, production
 Julian Gallagher – writing, programming, production
 Dave Morgan – writing, guitars
 Will Young – writing, vocals
 Simon Hale – writing, keyboards
 Sharon Murphy – backing vocals
 Steve Lewinson – bass
 Alvin Sweeney – drums, programming, recording, mixing
 Paul J. Brady – recording and mixing assistant
 Richard Dowling – mastering
 Root – artwork design
 Lee Strickland – photography

Charts

Weekly charts

Year-end charts

Certifications

Release history

References

Will Young songs
19 Recordings singles
2002 singles
2002 songs
Bertelsmann Music Group singles
Children in Need singles
RCA Records singles
Song recordings produced by Richard Stannard (songwriter)
Songs written by Julian Gallagher
Songs written by Richard Stannard (songwriter)
Songs written by Will Young
Syco Music singles